The Roman Catholic Diocese of Nouna is a diocese located in the city of Nouna in the Ecclesiastical province of Bobo-Dioulasso in Burkina Faso.

History
 12 June 1947: Established as Apostolic Prefecture of Nouna from the Apostolic Prefecture of Gao in Mali 
 18 October 1951: Promoted as Apostolic Vicariate of Nouna
 14 September 1955: Promoted as Diocese of Nouna 
 3 December 1975: Renamed as Diocese of Nouna–Dédougou
 14 April 2000: Renamed as Diocese of Nouna

Persecution 
Like many other parts of Burkina Faso, the Diocese of Nouna has been subjected to incidents of persecution of Christians by Muslim extremists. One such case occurred in July 2022, when jihadists attacked the village of Bourasso killing at least 22 people, according to official figures, though some witnesses spoke of up to 30 deaths.

Special churches
The cathedral is the Cathédrale Notre Dame du Perpétuel Sécours in Nouna.

Bishops

Ordinaries, in reverse chronological order
 Bishop of Nouna (Roman rite), below
 Bishop Joseph Sama (since 14 April 2000)
 Bishops of Nouna–Dédougou (Roman rite), below
 Bishop Zéphyrin Toé (5 July 1973  – 14 April 2000), appointed Bishop of Dédougou 
 Bishop of Nouna (Roman rite), below
 Bishop Jean-Marie Lesourd, M. Afr. (14 September 1955  – 5 July 1973); see below
 Vicar Apostolic of Nouna (Roman rite), below 
 Bishop Jean-Marie Lesourd, M. Afr. (18 October 1951  – 14 September 1955); see above & below
 Prefect Apostolic of Nouna (Roman rite), below
 Father Jean-Marie Lesourd, M. Afr. (17 October 1947  – 18 October 1951); see above

Other priests of this diocese who became bishops
Judes Bicaba (priest here, 1975-2000), appointed Bishop of Dédougou in 2005
Prosper Bonaventure Ky, appointed Bishop of Dédougou in 2018

See also
Roman Catholicism in Burkina Faso

References

External links
 GCatholic.org

Nouna
Christian organizations established in 1947
Roman Catholic dioceses and prelatures established in the 20th century
Nouna, Roman Catholic Diocese of
1947 establishments in French Upper Volta
Roman Catholic bishops of Nouna